Ovakışla is a town (belde) in Ahlat District, Bitlis Province, Turkey. Its population is 4,142 (2021).

References

Towns in Turkey
Populated places in Bitlis Province
Ahlat District